William Bergen may refer to:
William M. Bergen (1862–1934), American politician
Bill Bergen (1878–1943), American baseball player